Brittany McPhee (born 12 January 1996) is an American professional basketball player.

College career
McPhee began her college career at Stanford University in Stanford, California for the Cardinal. During her time at Stanford, McPhee achieved several accolades from a range of platforms and the Pac-12 Conference of NCAA Division I. This included the 2017 Pac-12 All-Academic Second Team and 2018 Pac-12 All-Academic First Team.

College statistics

|-
| style="text-align:left;"| 2014–15
| style="text-align:left;"| Stanford
| 30 || 8 || 9.9 || .359 || .194 || .780 || 2.3 || 0.3 || 0.4 || 0.5 || 3.5
|-
| style="text-align:left;"| 2015–16
| style="text-align:left;"| Stanford
| 34 || 3 || 16.6 || .414 || .343|| .737 || 3.1 || 0.6 || 0.3 || 0.4 || 6.5
|-
| style="text-align:left;"| 2016–17
| style="text-align:left;"| Stanford
| 37 || 37 || 29.0 || .446 || .709 || .772 || 4.9 || 2.0 || 0.8 || 0.9 || 13.3
|-
| style="text-align:left;"| 2017–18
| style="text-align:left;"| Stanford
| 26 || 26 || 31.7 || .447 || .267 || .687 || 5.4 || 2.4 || 1.3 || 0.7 || 16.7
|-
| style="text-align:center;" colspan="2"|Career
| 127 || 74 || 21.7 || .433 || .288 || .716 || 3.9 || 1.3 || 0.7 || 0.6 || 9.8
|-

Professional career

WNBA
McPhee was signed as a free-agent to the Seattle Storm training camp roster in April 2018. However, a month later McPhee was then waived by the storm.

WNBL
In September 2018, McPhee was signed by the Perth Lynx in the Women's National Basketball League.

References

1996 births
Living people
American women's basketball players
Guards (basketball)
Stanford Cardinal women's basketball players
Perth Lynx players
American expatriate sportspeople in Australia
Basketball players from Seattle